The 2016 Prototype Cup (later renamed the LMP3 Cup Championship) was the inaugural event for the British LMP3 Cup. The series debuted at Snetterton Circuit on 8/9 October 2016, with a single race to launch the championship, which was won by Tockwith Motorsport's Phil Hanson and Nigel Moore.

Report

Qualifying 
Phil Hanson and Nigel Moore set the early pace in qualifying, setting a quick lap around three seconds ahead of the rest of the field. Christian England and Colin Noble followed up for Team West-Tec, 0.8s behind, with Shaun Lynn third for United Autosports.

Race 
After a brief delay to allow light rain to clear the circuit, Phil Hanson led from pole, from Christian England, who switched to the sister Team West-Tec car after problems with the one he and Noble qualified. The lead two cars would remain unchallenged through the race, even after the pit stops, with Jay Palmer and Wayne Boyd's United Autosports Ligier coming home in third.

Qualifying

Race

References

External links
 Official series website

LMP3 Cup
LMP3 Cup